Taramati is one of two peaks on Harishchandragad. This is the Sixth Highest Peak in Maharashtra State (1431 m/ 4695 ft above sea level) and is ranked just after Salher. Located atop the Harishchandragad Plateau, this place offers a great trekking experience for both amateurs and experts because of its sheer beauty.
However, there is another very popular personality by name Taramati known to people of Hyderabad, India. Taramati was a famous singer  in courts of Qutub Shahi rulers in 14the Century. Taramti Baradhari is a tourist spot in Hyderabad city. 

Mountains of Maharashtra
Ahmednagar district

taramati